is a railway station located in the city of Yokkaichi, Mie Prefecture, Japan, operated by Central Japan Railway Company (JR Tōkai). It also has a freight depot of the Japan Freight Railway Company (JR Freight).

Lines
Minami-Yokkaichi Station is served by the Kansai Main Line, and is 40.4 rail kilometers from the terminus of the line at Nagoya Station. Trains on the Ise Railway Ise Line often stop at this station, although the official terminal station for the line is at Kawarada Station

Layout
The station consists of a single island platform connected to the station building by a level crossing.

Platform

Adjacent stations

|-
!colspan=5|JR Central

Station history
It was upgraded to a full station on the Kansai Main Line of the Japan National Railways (JNR) on October 1, 1963 and was renamed to its present name at that time. Operations of the Ise Line were extended through Minami-Yokkaichi Station on September 1, 1973. The station was absorbed into the JR Central network upon the privatization of the JNR on April 1, 1987. The station has been unattended since April 1, 2011.

Scheduled freight operations began from September 20, 1934. Containerized freight operations were discontinued on July 1, 1975, but were resumed from September 1, 1993.

Station numbering was introduced to the section of the Kansai Main Line operated JR Central in March 2018; Minami-Yokkaichi Station was assigned station number CI12.

Passenger statistics
In fiscal 2019, the station was used by an average of 715 passengers daily (boarding passengers only).

Surrounding area
Mie Prefectural Yokkaichi Technical High School
Kaisei High School
Ohashi Gakuen High School

See also
 List of railway stations in Japan

References

External links

Railway stations in Japan opened in 1963
Railway stations in Mie Prefecture
Stations of Japan Freight Railway Company
Yokkaichi